Marat Safin was the defending champion but lost in the quarterfinals to Paradorn Srichaphan.

Yevgeny Kafelnikov won in the final 7–6(8–6), 7–5 against Vladimir Voltchkov.

Seeds
A champion seed is indicated in bold text while text in italics indicates the round in which that seed was eliminated.

Draw

Finals

References

ATP Tashkent Open
2002 ATP Tour